The discography of American musician Anderson .Paak has released four studio albums, two collaborative albums, four extended plays (EP), four mixtapes and 18 singles.

Albums

Studio albums

Collaborative albums

Mixtapes

Extended plays

Singles

As lead artist

As featured artist

Other charted songs

Notes

Guest appearances

Production discography

References

Discographies of American artists
Hip hop discographies
Contemporary R&B discographies
Soul music discographies